Barnet House is an eleven-story office block at 1255 High Road, on the corner of Baxendale, at Whetstone, London, N20.

It was built as an office block, Ever Ready House, the headquarters of the British Ever Ready Electrical Company, before later becoming offices for the London Borough of Barnet including for the council's housing department.

In March 2017, it was announced that it would be converted into 254 flats, some as small as 16 square metres. The size of the smallest flats in the building was criticised by local councillors with one saying "These rabbit hutch homes would turn Barnet House into a human filing cabinet".

In December 2017 it was reported that the planning application to convert the building to residential accommodation had been rejected by the London Mayor Sadiq Khan on the grounds that the application included too few affordable homes.

References

External links 

Whetstone, London
Office buildings in London